Teodor (fl. 1594) was the Serbian Orthodox Bishop of Vršac (епископ вршачки), who in 1594 was the leader of the Banat Uprising against Ottoman occupation amidst the Long War (1593-1606). After talks with Sigismund Báthory, Teodor organized the revolt with Sava Ban and voivode Velja Mironić. The revolt saw the liberation of the villages of Banat, with Vršac. The Serb rebels used icon depictions of Saint Sava as war flags, as it would strengthen them in battle. Sinan Pasha of Temeşvar Eyalet captured Teodor and had him flayed and burned alive. The same year, as a response to the uprising, Saint Sava's remains were burnt at the Vračar hill on the order of Sinan Pasha, who fought the rebels. Teodor was proclaimed a saint (as "Свети свештеномученик Теодор, епископ вршачки", Saint Hieromartyr Theodore, Bishop of Vršac) of the Serbian Orthodox Church, canonized on May 29, 1994, with his feast on May 16 (Julian), or May 29 (Gregorian).

Notes

References

Sources
 
 
 

  

1585 deaths
16th-century Serbian people
16th-century Eastern Orthodox bishops
16th-century executions by the Ottoman Empire
Bishops of the Serbian Orthodox Church
Christian saints killed by Muslims
Habsburg Serbs
History of Banat
People executed by flaying
People of the Long Turkish War
People from Vršac
Ottoman history of Vojvodina
Ottoman Serbia
Serbs from the Ottoman Empire
Serbian saints of the Eastern Orthodox Church
Serbian military leaders
Serbian rebels
Temeşvar Eyalet
Year of birth missing
16th-century people from the Ottoman Empire